The NO BAN Act is a proposed United States law that imposes limitations on the President's authority to suspend or restrict illegal immigrants from entering the United States.

Background

Provisions

Legislative history 
As of April 28, 2021:

See also 

 List of bills in the 116th United States Congress
 List of bills in the 117th United States Congress

References

External links 

Proposed legislation of the 116th United States Congress
Proposed legislation of the 117th United States Congress
United States administrative law